David Horovitz (born 12 August 1962) is a British-born Israeli journalist, author and speaker. He is the founding editor of The Times of Israel, a current affairs website based in Jerusalem that launched in February 2012. Previously, he had been the editor-in-chief of The Jerusalem Post and The Jerusalem Report.

Biography
David Horovitz was born in London. He is the great-grandson of Rabbi Márkus Horovitz.

Horovitz immigrated to Israel in 1983. He served in the Education and Youth Corps of the Israeli Defense Forces. He and his wife Lisa have three children.

Journalism career
David Horovitz worked for the Post from 1983 to 1990. He then worked at The Jerusalem Report, where he was the editor from 1998 and publisher from 2001. In October 2004, Horovitz rejoined the Post as editor-in-chief. David announced he was leaving The Jerusalem Post in a postscript to his final editor's notes column on Friday 1 July 2011. In his final column for the Post, Horovitz interviewed Jimmy Wales. In February 2012, together with Seth Klarman of the Baupost Group, Horovitz launched The Times of Israel, an English-language Israeli news website published out of Jerusalem.

Horovitz has also written for Israel for newspapers around the world, including The New York Times, Los Angeles Times, The Irish Times and The Independent in London. He has been a frequent interviewee on IBA, CNN, the BBC, NPR and other TV and radio stations.

Horovitz is the author of Still Life with Bombers: Israel in the Age of Terrorism (2004) and of A Little Too Close to God : The Thrills and Panic of a Life in Israel (2000). He edited and co-wrote The Jerusalem Report'''s 1996 biography of Yitzhak Rabin, Shalom, Friend: The Life and Legacy of Yitzhak Rabin, which won the US National Jewish Book Award for Non-Fiction.

In 1995, he received the B'nai B'rith World Center award for journalism for his coverage of the 1994 AMIA bombing of the Jewish community centre in Buenos Aires. In 2005, he received the JDC award for journalism on Israel and Diaspora affairs.

In 2014, Horovitz was awarded B'nai B'rith's Lifetime Achievement Award for Israeli journalism. Accepting the award, Horovitz said: "Honest, fair, independent journalism is in ever shorter supply around the world, most certainly including in Israel... I’m proud to think that in a world with so much partisan, shrill and incitement-filled media, we [at The Times of Israel] are part of the antidote."

Views and opinions
Horovitz had counted himself among Israel's political left but grew disillusioned with the peace process after the Second Palestinian Intifada. He described himself in 2015 as a member of the "confused middle ground of Israeli politics". His books A Little Too Close to God (2000) and Still Life with Bombers (2004) show admiration of the late Yitzhak Rabin and criticism of Benjamin Netanyahu.

Published worksShalom, Friend : The Life and Legacy of Yitzhak Rabin (1996)A Little Too Close to God: The Thrills and Panic of a Life in Israel (2000)Still Life with Bombers: Israel in the Age of Terrorism'' (2004)

References

External links
 http://blogs.timesofisrael.com/starting-the-times-of-israel/
. The author's website.
 http://www.harrywalker.com/speaker/David-Horovitz.cfm?Spea_ID=1496. Lecture bureau.
Interview: David Horovitz Discusses Israel's Intricate Gaza Withdrawal
The Personal and the Political: Talking with David Horovitz
 Jimmy Wales’s benevolent Wikipedia wisdom

Israeli people of English-Jewish descent
Israeli Jews
English Jews
English emigrants to Israel
1962 births
Living people
The Jerusalem Post editors
Israeli non-fiction writers
Journalists from London